The Long March 1 (长征一号), also known as the Changzheng-1 (CZ-1), was the first member of China's Long March rocket family. Like the U.S.'s and the Soviet Union's first rockets, it was based on a class of ballistic missiles, namely the DF-4 class.

History 
Development started in January 1965 as the Seventh Ministry of Machinery Industry issued a design task. The two stage liquid fueled DF-4 was modified by adding a third stage in order to make it to the desired orbit. Long March 1's second flight launched China's first satellite Dong Fang Hong 1 to space on 24 April 1970. The rocket was operational during 1970–1971. Wang Xiji was the chief designer of the rocket.

Launch History

See also 

 DF-4 - ICBM on which this rocket is based
 Long March 1D - Other member of this rocket family
 YF-2A - Main propulsion module
 FG-02 - Upper stage

References 

Long March (rocket family)
Vehicles introduced in 1970